The 1901 Massachusetts Aggies football team was an American football team that represented Massachusetts Agricultural College in the 1901 college football season. The team was coached by James Halligan and played its home games at Alumni Field in Amherst, Massachusetts. The 1901 season was Halligan's first as head coach of the Aggies. Massachusetts finished the season with a record of 9–1.

Schedule

References

Massachusetts
UMass Minutemen football seasons
Massachusetts Aggies football